Harold Warren Moon (born November 18, 1956) is an American former professional football player who was a quarterback for 23 seasons. He spent the majority of his career with the Houston Oilers of the National Football League (NFL) and the Edmonton Eskimos of the Canadian Football League (CFL). In the NFL, Moon also played for the Minnesota Vikings, Seattle Seahawks, and Kansas City Chiefs. Moon is considered one of the greatest undrafted players in NFL history.

Moon began his professional career with the Eskimos in 1978 after not generating interest from NFL teams. His success during his six CFL seasons, five of which ended in Grey Cup victories, resulted in him being signed by the Oilers for 1984. During his 17 NFL seasons, Moon was named Offensive Player of the Year in 1990 after leading the league in passing yards and passing touchdowns. Moon led the NFL in passing yards twice, while also receiving nine Pro Bowl selections. He spent 10 seasons with the Oilers, who he led to seven playoff appearances, and made an eighth postseason run with the Vikings before retiring in 2000.

At the time of his retirement, Moon held several all-time professional gridiron football passing records. Although relatively unsuccessful in the NFL postseason, his five consecutive Grey Cups from 1978 to 1982 remain a CFL record and he was twice named Grey Cup MVP. Moon was inducted to the Pro Football Hall of Fame in 2006, becoming the first black quarterback and the first undrafted quarterback to receive the honor. He is also the only player inducted to both the Pro Football Hall of Fame and the Canadian Football Hall of Fame.

Early years
Born in Los Angeles, California, Moon was the middle child amongst six sisters. His father, Harold, was a laborer and died of liver disease when Moon was seven years old. His mother, Pat, was a nurse, and Warren learned to cook, sew, iron and housekeep to help take care of the family. He decided early on that he could play only one sport in high school because he had to work the rest of the year to help the family. He chose to play football as a quarterback since he found that he could throw a football longer, harder, and straighter than anyone he knew.

He enrolled at Alexander Hamilton High School, using the address of one of his mother's friends to gain the advantages of a better academic and athletic reputation than his neighborhood high school could offer. He had little playing time until his junior year, when he took over as varsity starting quarterback. In his senior season in 1973, they reached the city playoffs, and Moon was named to the all-city team.

College career
Moon attended two-year West Los Angeles College, and was a record-setting quarterback as a freshman in 1974, but only a handful of four-year colleges showed interest in signing him. Offensive coordinator Dick Scesniak of the University of Washington in Seattle, however, was eager to sign the rifle-armed Moon. Adamant that he play quarterback, Moon considered himself to be perhaps a slightly above-average athlete who lacked either the size, speed, or strength to play other positions.

Moon was named the game's Most Valuable Player on the strength of two short touchdown runs and a third-quarter 28-yard touchdown pass to wide receiver Robert "Spider" Gaines.

College statistics

Professional career

Edmonton Eskimos
Despite his collegiate success, Moon was led to believe he would only be a late-round NFL pick and was fearful that would lead to a limited opportunity to make it in the NFL. Six weeks before the NFL draft, Moon signed with the Edmonton Eskimos, where he and Tom Wilkinson shared signal-calling duties and helped lead the Eskimos to a record five consecutive Grey Cup victories in 1978, 1979, 1980, 1981, and 1982. Moon won the Grey Cup MVP award in the 1980 and 1982 championships, and became the first professional quarterback to pass for 5,000 yards in a season by reaching exactly 5,000 yards in 1982.

In his final CFL season of 1983, he threw for a league-record 5,648 yards and won the CFL's Most Outstanding Player Award. The season was not as successful for the Eskimos however, as they finished 8-8. Having barely made the playoffs (which they would have missed altogether if not for a loss by the Calgary Stampeders to the last place Saskatchewan Roughriders in the last week of the regular season), Moon's Eskimos were throttled in Winnipeg by the Blue Bombers in the West semi-final.

In his six years in the CFL, Moon amassed 1,369 completions on 2,382 attempts (57.4 completion percentage) for 21,228 yards and 144 touchdown passes. He also led his team to victory in 9 of 10 postseason games. He was inducted into the Canadian Football Hall of Fame in 2001 and the Eskimos' Wall of Honour. In 2006, he was ranked fifth on a list of the greatest 50 CFL players presented by Canadian sports network TSN.

Houston Oilers

Moon's decision to enter the NFL touched off a bidding war for his services, won by the Houston Oilers, led by Hugh Campbell, his head coach for his first five seasons in Edmonton. Gifford Nielsen—the starting quarterback in 1983—retired after Moon joined the team, stating that Moon becoming the starter was inevitable. Moon had a difficult adjustment period, but threw for a franchise-record 3,338 yards in his first season in 1984, but Campbell was just  at the helm and did not finish the 1985 season. When new head coach Jerry Glanville found ways to best use Moon's strong arm in 1986, the team began having success. In the strike-marred 1987 season, the Oilers posted a  record, their first winning season since 1980. In his first postseason game in the NFL, Moon passed for 237 yards and a touchdown in the Oilers' 23–20 overtime win over the Seattle Seahawks in the wildcard round of the playoffs.

Prior to the 1989 season, Moon signed a five-year, $10-million contract extension, which made him the highest-paid player in the NFL at that time. In 1990, Moon led the league with 4,689 passing yards. He also led the league in attempts (584), completions (362), and touchdowns (33), and tied Dan Marino's record with nine 300-yard games in a season. That included throwing for 527 yards against Kansas City on December 16, 1990, the second-most passing yards ever in a single game. The following year, he again led the league in passing yards, with 4,690. At the same time, he joined Marino and Dan Fouts as the only quarterbacks to post back-to-back 4,000-yard seasons. Moon also established new NFL records that season with 655 attempts and 404 completions.

In 1992, Moon played only 11 games due to injuries, but the Oilers still managed to achieve a 10–6 record, including a victory over the Buffalo Bills, in the final game of the season. Two weeks later, the Oilers faced the Bills again in the first round of the AFC playoffs. Aided by Moon's 222 passing yards and four touchdowns in the first half, Houston built up a 28–3 halftime lead and increased it to 35–3 when Buffalo quarterback Frank Reich's first pass of the third quarter was intercepted and returned for a touchdown. The Bills stormed back with five unanswered second-half touchdowns to take a 38–35 lead with time running out in the final period. Moon managed to lead the Oilers on a last-second field goal drive to tie the game at 38 and force overtime, but threw an interception in the extra period that set up Buffalo kicker Steve Christie's game-winning field goal. The Bills' rally from a 32-point deficit at that time was the largest comeback victory in NFL history and became known in NFL lore simply as the Comeback. Moon finished the game with 36 completions for 371 yards and four touchdowns, with two interceptions. His 36 completions was an NFL postseason record.

The 1993 season was the Oilers' best with Moon, but was his last with the team. Despite a drama-filled 1–4 start and early struggles from Moon, Houston went 12–4 and won the AFC Central division crown, but lost to Joe Montana and the Kansas City Chiefs 28–20 in the divisional round of the playoffs.

Moon set a franchise record with Houston for wins with 70, which stood until Steve McNair broke it in 2004, long after the team had become the Tennessee Titans. He also left the Oilers as the franchise leader in passing touchdowns, passing yards, pass attempts, and pass completions, all of which still stand today.

Minnesota Vikings
Moon was traded to the Minnesota Vikings after the season, where he passed for over 4,200 yards in each of his first two seasons, but missed half of the 1996 season with a broken collarbone. The Vikings' starting quarterback job was given to Brad Johnson and Moon was released after he refused to take a $3.8-million pay cut to serve as Johnson's backup.

Seattle Seahawks
Moon signed with the Seattle Seahawks as a free agent in 1997, made the Pro Bowl, and was named Pro Bowl MVP. He played for them for two seasons.

Kansas City Chiefs
Moon signed as a free agent with the Kansas City Chiefs as a backup in 1999. He played in only three games in two years with the Chiefs and announced his retirement at age 44 in January 2001. His 291st and final touchdown pass was an 8-yard pass to Troy Drayton against the Rams on October 22, 2000, a game in which the Chiefs defeated the defending champs, 54–34.

Legacy
Combining his NFL and CFL stats, Moon's numbers are nearly unmatched in professional football annals: 5,357 completions in 9,205 attempts for 70,553 yards and 435 touchdowns. Even if his Canadian Football League statistics are discounted, Moon's NFL career numbers are still exceptional: 3,988 completions for 49,325 yards, 291 touchdown passes, 1,736 yards rushing, and 22 rushing touchdowns. Moon also held individual NFL lifetime records for most fumbles recovered (56) and most fumbles made (162), but this was surpassed by Brett Favre in 2010. Moon was in the top five all-time when he retired for passing yards, passing touchdowns, pass attempts, and pass completions.

Moon was named to 9 Pro Bowls (1988–1995, 1997). He worked as a broadcaster for the Seattle Seahawks on both TV and radio until 2017. He was elected into the Pro Football Hall of Fame in 2006, becoming both the first Canadian Football Hall of Fame player, first undrafted quarterback, and first African-American quarterback honored; he was elected in his first year of eligibility. The Tennessee Titans retired his number at halftime on October 1, 2006 vs the Dallas Cowboys. Moon won his first Super Bowl ring in 2014 as a broadcaster for the Seattle Seahawks.

Post-NFL career

Moon has mentored Cam Newton, the first overall pick of the 2011 NFL Draft, alluding to their common experiences as prominent African-American quarterbacks. He was suspended indefinitely from his sportscaster position after he was sued in December 2017 for sexual harassment.

Career statistics

CFL statistics

NFL statistics

Regular season

Postseason

Franchise records
Moon remains statistically one of the best players ever for the Oilers/Titans franchise. 's NFL off-season, Moon still held at least 37 Titans franchise records, including:
 Most Completions (career): 2,632
 Most Completions (season): 404 (1991)
 Most Completions (game): 41 (1991-11-10 DAL)
 Most Completions (playoff career): 230
 Most Completions (playoff game): 36 (1993-01-03 @BUF)
 Most Completions (rookie season): 259 (1984)
 Most Pass Attempts (career): 4,546
 Most Pass Attempts (season): 655 (1991)
 Most Pass Attempts (playoff career): 351
 Most Pass Attempts (playoff game): 50 (1993-01-03 @BUF)
 Most Pass Attempts (rookie season): 450 (1984)
 Most Passing Yards (career): 33,685
 Most Passing Yards (season): 4,690 (1991)
 Most Passing Yards (game): 527 (1990-12-16 @KAN)
 Most Passing Yards (playoff career): 2,578
 Most Passing Yards (playoff game): 371 (1993-01-03 @BUF)
 Most Passing Yards (rookie season): 3,338 (1984)
 Most Passing TDs (career): 196
 Most Passing TDs (playoff career): 15
 Most Passing TDs (playoff season): 5 (1991)
 Most Passing TDs (playoff game): 4 (1993-01-03 @BUF)
 Most Pass Yds/Game (career): 238.9
 Most Pass Yds/Game (season): 312.6 (1990)
 Most Pass Yds/Game (playoff career): 286.4
 Most Pass Yds/Game (playoff season): 371 (1992)
 Most 300+ yard passing games (career): 42
 Most 300+ yard passing games (season): 9 (1990)
 Most 300+ yard passing games (playoffs): 4
 Most 300+ yard passing games (rookie season): 4
 Most 4,000+ passing yard seasons: 2
 Most Intercepted (playoff career): 12
 Most Sacked (career): 315
 Most Sacked (season): 47 (1984)
 Most Sacked (game): 12 (1985-09-29 DAL)
 Most Sacked (playoff career): 22
 Most Sacked (playoff game): 9 (1994-01-16 KAN)
 Most Sacked (rookie season): 47 (1984)

Awards
 9× Pro Bowl selection (1988, 1989, 1990, 1991, 1992, 1993, 1994, 1995, 1997)
 All-Pro selection (1990)
 5× Grey Cup champion (66th, 67th, 68th, 69th, 70th)
 2001 Enshrined on Eskimos' Wall of Fame
 1990 NEA NFL MVP
 1990 NFL Offensive Player of the Year
 1990 UPI AFL-AFC Player of the Year
 1989 Man of the Year
 1997 Pro Bowl MVP
 1982 Grey Cup MVP
 1980 Grey Cup MVP
 1983 CFL Most Outstanding Player
 1983 Jeff Nicklin Memorial Trophy
 1978 Rose Bowl MVP
 1977 Pac-8 Player of the Year
 Oilers/Titans Career Passing Yards Leader with 32,685
 Tennessee Titans #1 Retired
 Hall of Fame (inducted in 2006)
 University of Washington Ring of Honor (Inaugural Member in 2013)

Personal life
Moon married Felicia Hendricks, whom he had known since they were 16 years old, in 1981. They divorced in 2001.

Moon currently lives in Redmond, Washington.

See also
 List of 500-yard passing games in the National Football League
 List of National Football League career quarterback wins leaders

References

External links

 
 
 
 Warren Moon at Canada's Sports Hall of Fame
 Sports1Marketing

1956 births
Living people
African-American players of American football
African-American players of Canadian football
Alexander Hamilton High School (Los Angeles) alumni
American Conference Pro Bowl players
American expatriates in Canada
American football quarterbacks
Canadian Football Hall of Fame inductees
Canadian Football League Most Outstanding Player Award winners
Canadian football quarterbacks
Ed Block Courage Award recipients
Edmonton Elks players
Houston Oilers players
Kansas City Chiefs players
Minnesota Vikings players
National Conference Pro Bowl players
National Football League announcers
National Football League Offensive Player of the Year Award winners
National Football League players with retired numbers
Players of American football from Los Angeles
Players of Canadian football from Los Angeles
Pro Football Hall of Fame inductees
Seattle Seahawks announcers
Seattle Seahawks players
Sportspeople from Redmond, Washington
Washington Huskies football players
West Los Angeles Wildcats football players